is the capital and the largest city of Tottori Prefecture in the Chūgoku region of Japan. , the city had an estimated population of 183,383 in 81,732 households and a population density of 240 persons per km². Most within the San'in Kaigan Geopark.

Geography 
The city of Tottori which located in east next to the Chūgoku Mountains, the city flows the Sendai River. It is 300 km by land from Hiroshima city,  which is a regional hub city in the Chūgoku region, but on the other hand, it is 180 km from Kobe City,  190 km from Osaka City, and 220 km from Kyoto City. Within Japan the city is best known for the Tottori Sand Dunes which are a popular tourist attraction, drawing visitors from outside the prefecture. The sand dunes are also important as a centre for research into arid agriculture, hosting Tottori University's Arid Land Research Center.

Neighboring municipalities 
Tottori Prefecture
 Yazu
 Misasa
Chizu
 Iwami
 Yurihama
 Wakasa
Hyōgo Prefecture 
 Shin'onsen
Okayama Prefecture 
 Kagamino
 Tsuyama

Climate 
Tottori has a humid subtropical climate (Köppen climate classification Cfa) with hot summers and cool winters. Precipitation is abundant throughout the year.

Demographics
Per Japanese census data, the population of Tottori is as follows. Tottori has the lowest population among prefectural capitals in Japan.

History 
Tottori is part of ancient Inaba Province, and the place name "Tottori" can be found in the early Heian period Wamyō Ruijushō. Tottori Castle was completed in 1545 and the surrounding castle town forms the core of the modern city. During the Edo period, Tottori was the seat of a branch of the Ikeda clan, which ruled Tottori Domain. Following the Meiji restoration, Tottori was incorporated as a city on October 1, 1889, with the implementation of the modern municipalities system. 

Most of the downtown area was destroyed by the Tottori earthquake of September 10, 1943, which killed over 1000 people, and much of the rebuilt city was destroyed again in the Great Tottori Fire of April 17, 1952. In the 1950s, and again in 2004, redistricting ("gappei") of the city's borders increased its size to include a number of surrounding areas. On November 1, 2004, the town of Kokufu, the village of Fukube (both from Iwami District), the towns of Aoya, Ketaka and Shikano (all from Ketaka District), the towns of Kawahara and Mochigase and the village of Saji (all from Yazu District) were merged into Tottori. Ketaka District was dissolved as a result of this merger.

Tottori gained special city status on October 1, 2005, with in increased local autonomy. The 2016 Tottori earthquake caused moderate damage and several injuries, but no fatalities.

Government
Tottori has a mayor-council form of government with a directly elected mayor and a unicameral city council of 32 members. Tottori contributes 12 members to the Tottori Prefectural Assembly. In terms of national politics, the city is part of Tottori 1st district of the lower house of the Diet of Japan.

Economy
As the administrative citer of Tottori Prefecture, the city of Tottori is the regional center for commerce.  Agricultural products include rice and Tottori is also famous for its production of scallions

Education

Universities and colleges
Tottori City has two universities. The main campus of Tottori University, a national public university, is located next to Koyama Lake on the west end of the city. The privately funded Tottori University of Environmental Studies is located in the south-eastern part of Tottori city, near the town of Yazu. These two universities are not to be confused with the 2-year junior college in the prefecture, Tottori College, which is located in the central city of Kurayoshi.

Primary and secondary education
Tottori has 39 public elementary schools operated by the city government, and one by the national government. It has13 public middle schools operated by the city government, one by the national government and one private middle school.The city has seven public high schools operated by the Tottori Prefectural Board of Education, and four private high schools. The prefecture also operates four special education schools for the handicapped and there is one more special education school operated by the national government.

Transportation

Airports
Tottori Airport

Railway 
 JR West - San'in Main Line
  -  -  -  -  -  -  - 
 JR West - Inbi Line
  -  - < -  - > -   -  -  -

Highways 
  Tottori Expressway
  San'in Expressway
  San'in Kinki Expressway

Sister city relations

  Kushiro, Hokkaido, Japan, since October 4, 1963
  Himeji, Hyōgo, Japan, since March 8, 1972
  Iwakuni, Yamaguchi, Japan, since October 13, 1995

  Hanau, Hesse, Germany
  Cheongju, North Chungcheong, South Korea
 - Shahe, Hebei, China,  friendship city since 1995
 - Taicang, Jiangsu, China,  friendship city since 1995

Local attractions

Outline 
The city's main street (Wakasa, or "young cherry blossom" street) runs north from the station and terminates at the foot of the Kyushouzan ("eternal pine") mountain. Around this mountain lies the oldest part of the city. Its centre is the now ruined Tottori Castle, once the property of the Ikeda clan daimyō who ruled the Tottori Domain during the Edo period. It is open to the public, and is the site of the Castle Festival in autumn each year. In the vicinity are temples, museums, and public parks. The city also hosts the prefecturally famous Shan-shan festival in the summer, which features teams of people dressing up and dancing with large umbrellas; the name 'Shan-shan' is said to come from the sound made by the small bells and pieces of metal attached to the umbrellas, which are very large. An exceptionally big example of a Shan-shan umbrella graces the main foyer of Tottori Station.

At the beginning of every summer, Tottori is host to one of the biggest beach parties in the country, the San In Beach Party. The event lasts an entire weekend and some top names on the national DJ circuit are invited to perform.

Museums
Tottori City Historical Museum
Tottori Folk Crafts Museum
Tottori Prefectural Museum
Tottori Sand Museum
Watanabe Art Museum

Sports facilities
Axis Bird Stadium
Yamata Sports Park Stadium

Shrines and temples
Ube shrine, former ichinomiya of Inaba Province
Kōzen-ji, family temple of the Ikeda Clan
Ōchidani Shrine
Kannon-in, whose Japanese garden is a Special Place of Scenic Beauty of Japan
Mount Misumi

National Historic Sites
Ifukibe-no-Tokotari grave
Inaba Provincial Capital ruins
Kajiyama Kofun
Aoyakamiji Site
Tottori Castle
Tottori Domain Ikeda clan cemetery
Tochimoto temple ruins
Fuse Kofun

Other attractions
Tottori Sand Dunes
Jinpūkaku, French Renaissance-style residence of the Ikeda clan
Shikano Castle

Culture
Kaigara Bushi, a folk song

References

External links

 
  
 Tottori Sightseeing Association 

Cities in Tottori Prefecture
Port settlements in Japan
Populated coastal places in Japan
Tottori (city)